This is a list of the busiest railway stations in Austria, with all stations being considered as major stations, important junctions or hubs.

References 

Railway stations in Austria
Rail transport-related lists of superlatives